Ferdinand Chalandon (February 10, 1875 in Lyon – October 31, 1921 in Lausanne) was a French medievalist and Byzantinist.

Having begun his education in his hometown of Lyon, Chalandon moved to Paris and graduated from the Lycée Louis-le-Grand. With a degree in history he was admitted in 1895 into the École des Chartes, where he obtained his diplôme des hautes études in 1897 and the archivist's and paleographer's qualification in 1899. His first work on Alexios I Komnenos was presented as a thesis to the École des Chartes in 1900.

He subsequently spent two years in Italy with the École française de Rome, travelling widely, in particular across the South where he transcribed documents from monastic and capitular archives. This resulted in his two-volume study of the Norman conquest of the Mezzogiorno and the Norman kingdom of Sicily which won him the Grand prix Gobert in 1909. Unsurpassed in scope, it remains a landmark of scholarship on this period and was reprinted in the 1960s.

While his long-term project was to write a complete history of the Byzantine empire from the time of Justinian and a history of the Crusades, Chalandon next laid the foundations for the study of the Eastern Roman empire in the twelfth century. Building on his study of Alexios Komnenos, in 1912 he published a lengthy monograph on his successors, John II and Manuel I. Also in 1912, Chalandon travelled via Constantinople to Syria, Palestine and Egypt. His interest in the Middle East led to a collaboration with Gustave Schlumberger on Sigillographie de l'Orient latin, a project which Chalandon took over and brought to near completion by the time of his premature death in 1921 from health problems contracted during World War I. He had been researching two other volumes which never saw publication: Le Moyen Age chrétien et musulman du Ve au XIIIe siècle and Mahomet, les Arabes, les Huns. His history of the First Crusade was prepared from his notes by his wife, who also worked extensively on the Sigillographie before its final revision by Adrien Blanchet.

Publications
 Essai sur le règne d'Alexis Ier Comnène (1081-1118), Paris: A. Picard, 1900
 La diplomatique des Normands de Sicile et de l'Italie méridionale, Mélanges d'archéologie et d'histoire 20.1 (1900), pp. 155–197
 Histoire de la domination normande en Italie et en Sicile, Paris: A. Picard, 1907 (vol. I & vol. II)
 Jean II Comnène (1118-1143) et Manuel I Comnène (1143-1180), Paris: A. Picard, 1912 (vol. I & vol. II)
 Histoire de la première croisade jusqu'à l'élection de Godefroi de Bouillon, Paris: Floch, 1925
 (with Gustave Schlumberger and Adrien Blanchet) Sigillographie de l'Orient latin, Paris: Paul Geuthner, 1943

Notes

References 
  
 
 
 
 

20th-century French historians
Writers from Lyon
French Byzantinists
Historians of the Crusades
Historians of Sicily
1875 births
1921 deaths
Lycée Louis-le-Grand alumni
French male non-fiction writers
École Nationale des Chartes alumni